Elisa Togut (born 14 May 1978 in Gorizia) is an Italian former volleyball player who represented Italy at the 2000 Summer Olympics in Sydney, Australia. There she ended up in ninth place with the Women's National Team. Two years later, at the World Championship in Germany, she claimed the gold medal and was named Most Valuable Player of the tournament.

Honours
 1998 World Championship — 5th place
 1998 FIVB World Grand Prix — 5th place
 1999 FIVB World Cup — 7th place
 1999 FIVB World Grand Prix — 4th place
 2000 Olympic Games — 9th place
 2000 FIVB World Grand Prix — 7th place
 2001 European Championship — 2nd place
 2002 World Championship — 1st place
 2003 FIVB World Grand Prix — 5th place
 2004 Olympic Games — 5th place (tied)
 2005 European Championship — 2nd place

Individual awards
 2002 World Championship "Most Valuable Player"

References
 FIVB Profile

1978 births
Living people
People from Gorizia
Italian women's volleyball players
Volleyball players at the 2000 Summer Olympics
Volleyball players at the 2004 Summer Olympics
Olympic volleyball players of Italy
Sportspeople from Friuli-Venezia Giulia